Temporary Station Site was a railway station on the Walhalla narrow gauge line in Gippsland, Victoria, Australia. The station was never officially opened or named, it was used during the construction of the railway. It consisted of the main line and two loop lines, with a possible dead-end siding for ballast loading.

References

Disused railway stations in Victoria (Australia)
Transport in Gippsland (region)
Shire of Baw Baw
Walhalla railway line